Abdul Nawaz Bugti is a representative of Baloch Republican Party at the United Nations Human Rights Council.  He has been representing Balochistan during the regular sessions of the UNHRC, held every March, June and September every year.

External links 
 Abdul Nawaz Bugti at ThePrint

References

Living people
Abdul Nawaz
Year of birth missing (living people)